Aethes aurofasciana is a species of moth of the family Tortricidae. It is found in Austria, Switzerland, Germany, Italy, Slovakia, Slovenia and Poland.

The wingspan is 13–15 mm. Adults are on wing from June to August.

The larvae feed on Gentiana clusii.

References

Moths described in 1855
aurofasciana
Moths of Europe